Mount Eliza Secondary College is a public co-educational secondary school located in Mount Eliza, Victoria, Australia. As of 2019 the school caters to approximately 570 students in years 7 to 12 from the local area. There is a minute range of course options available to choose from in VCE, VET and VCAL courses as well as combinations of each. It has a strong international programme bringing new students to the school each year from abroad.

About the school
The school's educational system is divided into two sub-schools, each focusing mainly on the two year levels assigned to them. In an attempt to increase the focus of students at Mount Eliza Secondary College, there is an enforced compulsory school uniform.

History
Mount Eliza Secondary College was founded in 1975 with a staff of 16 teachers and just over 200 students. In 2015 the school celebrated 40 years since its opening.

Houses
 Warringa, blue
 Manyung, red
 Kirrang, yellow
 Kimmuli, green

References

External links 
 Mount Eliza Secondary College Website

Public high schools in Victoria (Australia)
Educational institutions established in 1975
Buildings and structures in the Shire of Mornington Peninsula
1975 establishments in Australia